

Endoparasites

Protozoan organisms

Helminths (worms)

Helminth organisms (also called helminths or intestinal worms) include:

Tapeworms

Flukes

Roundworms

Other organisms

Ectoparasites

References 

 
Parasites